Nebulae is a petascale supercomputer located at the National Supercomputing Center in Shenzhen, Guangdong, China. Built from a Dawning TC3600 Blade system with Intel Xeon X5650 processors and Nvidia Tesla C2050 GPUs, it has a peak performance of 1.271 petaflops using the LINPACK benchmark suite. Nebulae was ranked the second most powerful computer in the world in the June 2010 list of the fastest supercomputers according to TOP500. Nebulae has a theoretical peak performance of 2.9843 petaflops. This computer is used for multiple applications requiring advanced processing capabilities. It is ranked 10th among the June 2012 list of top500.org.

See also

Computer science
Computing
 Supercomputer centers in China
 TOP500

References

Further reading 
 "National Supercomputing Center starts construction in Shenzhen", People's Daily, November 17, 2009
 Fildes, Jonathan, "China aims to become supercomputer superpower", BBC News, 31 May 2010

GPGPU supercomputers
One-of-a-kind computers
Petascale computers
Supercomputing in China
X86 supercomputers